The Deluxe Town Diner is a historic diner in Watertown, Massachusetts.

This diner was manufactured on site, rather than having been prefabricated and shipped to the site from a specific diner manufacturer.  In 1947, George Contos and his father built this diner around their earlier Worcester Lunch Car Company diner. The Worcester diner became the kitchen in the current building.  The Town Diner's two-tone porcelain siding and its round glass-block corners combine architectural features of the Worcester and Paramount Diner manufacturers, respectively.

The diner was added to the National Register of Historic Places in 1999 as "Town Diner".

See also
National Register of Historic Places listings in Middlesex County, Massachusetts

References

External links

Commercial buildings completed in 1947
Diners on the National Register of Historic Places
Diners in Massachusetts
Restaurants on the National Register of Historic Places in Massachusetts
Buildings and structures in Watertown, Massachusetts
Tourist attractions in Middlesex County, Massachusetts
Restaurants established in 1947
1947 establishments in Massachusetts
National Register of Historic Places in Middlesex County, Massachusetts